Mangaliya Sadak is a census town in Indore district in the Indian state of Madhya Pradesh.

Demographics
 India census, Manglaya Sadak had a population of 5951. Males constitute 54% of the population and females 46%. Manglaya Sadak has an average literacy rate of 61%, higher than the national average of 59.5%: male literacy is 71%, and female literacy is 50%. In Manglaya Sadak, 15% of the population is under 6 years of age.

References

Cities and towns in Indore district